Gibberula ronchinorum is a species of sea snail, a marine gastropod mollusk, in the family Cystiscidae.

Description
The length of the shell attains 3.6 mm.

Distribution
This marine species occurs off Philippines.

References

ronchinorum
Gastropods described in 2017